The 2020 Edo State gubernatorial election occurred on September 19, 2020. Incumbent PDP Governor Godwin Obaseki won re-election for a second term, defeating APC Osagie Ize-Iyamu and several minor party candidates. Obaseki received 57.3% of the vote.

Godwin Obaseki emerged unopposed in the PDP gubernatorial primary after all the aspirants stepped down. He picked Philip Shaibu as his running mate.

Osagie Ize-Iyamu was the APC candidate with Audi Ganiyu as his running mate. Mabel Oboh was the ADC candidate. Iboi Lucky Emmanuel stood in for ADP in the polls, while Osifo Uhun-Ekpenma Isaiah represented LP. 14 candidates contested in the election, 12 were male, while 2 were female. Two of the deputy governorship candidates were female.

Electoral system
The Governor of Edo State is elected using the plurality voting system.

Primary election

PDP primary
The PDP primary election was held on June 25, 2020. Godwin Obaseki, the incumbent governor emerged unopposed after all the aspirants stepped down for him.

Candidates
Party nominee: Godwin Obaseki: Incumbent governor.
Running mate: Philip Shaibu.
Kenneth Imasuagbon: Stepped down.
Gideon Ikhine: Stepped down.
Omoregie Ogbeide-Ihama: Stepped down.

APC primary
The APC primary election was held on June 22, 2020. Osagie Ize-Iyamu won the primary election polling 27,833 votes against 2 other candidates. His closest rival was Pius Odubu, a former deputy governor in the state who came a distant second with 3,776 votes, while Osaze Obazee, a former governor in the state came third with 2,000 votes.

Candidates
Party nominee: Osagie Ize-Iyamu.
Running mate: Audu Ganiyu.
Pius Odubu: Former deputy governor. Lost in the primary election.
Osaze Obazee: Former governor. Lost in the primary election.

Results
A total of 14 candidates registered with the Independent National Electoral Commission to contest in the election. PDP Governor Godwin Obaseki won re-election for a second term, defeating APC Osagie Ize-Iyamu and several minor party candidates. Obaseki received 57.3% of the votes, while Ize-Iyamu received 41.6%.

The total number of registered voters in the state was 2,210,534 while 557,443 voters were accredited. Total number of votes cast was 550,242, while number of valid votes was 537,407. Rejected votes were 12,835.

By local government area
Here are the results of the election by local government area for the two major parties. The total valid votes of 537,407 represents the 14 political parties that participated in the election. Green represents LGAs won by Obaseki. Blue represents LGAs won by Ize-Iyamu.

References 

Edo State gubernatorial elections
Edo State gubernatorial election
Edo